Bessanèse (Uia di Bessanese in Italian) (3,594 m), is a mountain of the Graian Alps on the France and Italy border.

Features 
Most famous on its Italian side, the mountain lies at the head of the Valli di Lanzo, around 30 km north of Turin. A popular hiking peak, its summit lies on a 150 m long ridge.

Bibliography

Maps
 French  official cartography (Institut géographique national - IGN); on-line version: www.geoportail.fr
 Istituto Geografico Centrale - Carta dei sentieri e dei rifugi 1:50.000 nr 2 Valli di Lanzo e Moncenisio

References

Mountains of the Graian Alps
Alpine three-thousanders
Mountains of Savoie
Mountains of Piedmont
Mountains partially in France
International mountains of Europe